Asian American and Pacific Islander Heritage Month (officially changed from Asian/Pacific American Heritage Month) is observed in the United States during the month of May, and recognizes the contributions and influence of Asian Americans and Pacific Islander Americans to the history, culture, and achievements of the United States.

Background

The first Asians documented in the Americas arrived in 1587, when Filipinos landed in California; from 1898 to 1946, the Philippines was an American possession.  The next group of Asians documented in what would be the United States were Indians in Jamestown, documented as early as 1635. In 1778, the first Chinese to reach what would be the United States, arrived in Hawaii. In 1788, the first Native Hawaiian arrived on the continental United States, in Oregon; in 1900, Hawaii was annexed by the United States. The next group of Asians documented in what would be the United States were Japanese, who arrived in Hawaii in 1806. In 1884, the first Koreans arrived in the United States. In 1898, Guam was ceded to the United States; beginning in the 1900s, Chamorros began to migrate to California and Hawaii. In 1904, what is now American Samoa was ceded to the United States; beginning in the 1920s, Samoans began to migrate to Hawaii and the continental United States, with the first Samoans documented in Hawaii in 1920. In 1912, the first Vietnamese was documented in the United States.

History
A former congressional staffer in the 1970s, Jeanie Jew, first approached Representative Frank Horton with the idea of designating a month to recognize Asian Pacific Americans, following the bicentennial celebrations. In June 1977, Representatives Horton, and Norman Y. Mineta, introduced a United States House of Representatives resolution to proclaim the first ten days of May as Asian-Pacific Heritage Week. A similar bill was introduced in the Senate a month later by Daniel Inouye and Spark Matsunaga.

The proposed resolutions sought that May be designated for two reasons. For on May 7, 1843, the first Japanese immigrant arrived in the United States. More than two decades later, on May 10, 1869, the golden spike was driven into the First transcontinental railroad, which was completed using Chinese labor.

President Jimmy Carter signed a joint resolution for the celebration on October 5, 1978.

On May 1, 2009, President Barack Obama signed Proclamation 8369, recognizing the month of May as Asian American and Pacific Islander Heritage Month.

Federal legislation
"A joint resolution authorizing the President to proclaim annually a week during the first 10 days in May as Pacific/Asian American Heritage Week." was text in House Joint Resolution 540; this resolution as well as Senate Joint Resolution 72 did not pass. Ultimately, though, Rep. Horton's House Joint Resolution 1007 was passed by both the House and the Senate, and was signed by President Jimmy Carter on October 5, 1978, to become Public Law 95-419. In 1990, George H. W. Bush signed a bill passed by Congress to extend Asian-American Heritage Week to a month; May was officially designated as Asian/Pacific American Heritage Month two years later.

Observances
During Asian Pacific American Heritage Month, communities celebrate the achievements and contributions of Asian and Pacific Americans with community festivals, government-sponsored activities and educational activities for students.

Footnotes

References

External links

Asian-American culture
Commemorative months
May observances
Observances in the United States
Pacific Islands American history